Immanuel Aboab ( 1555 – 1628) was a Portuguese Jewish scholar. He was a great-grandson of Isaac Aboab of Castile (died 1493).

Life
Born at Porto, he early became an orphan and was reared by his grandfather Abraham Aboab. He emigrated to Italy, and after living some time at Pisa he moved to Corfu, where he became acquainted with Orazio del Monte, a nephew of the duke of Urbino.

In Reggio Emilia he became acquainted with Menahem Azariah da Fano; thence he went to Spoleto and elsewhere in Italy, and finally settled at Venice. Here he had occasion, in 1603, to defend his correligionists.

He died in Venice in 1628.

Works

Aboab had the intention of going to Palestine and publishing there his works, The Kingdom of the Intellect and The Foundations of Truth, which he had written in defense of the Talmud. He was the author of a defense of the traditional law and of a chronological list of that law's exponents. He worked at this treatise, which was much prized by the pious, for ten years, and completed it in 1625. It was published by his heirs at Amsterdam, in 1629 (2d ed., ibid., 1727), under the title Nomologia o Discursos Legales, Compuestos por el Virtuose Hakam Rabi Imanuel Aboab de Buena Memoria. A manuscript of this work exists in the library of the Historical Academy in Madrid.

References
De Rossi, Dizionario Storico, Germ. transl. by Hamberger, pp. 12–13
Kayserling, Immanuel Aboab, in Jeschurun, iv. 572 et seq., v. 643 et seq.;
 idem, Gesch. d. Juden in Port. pp. 271 et seq.
 Orfali, Moises, Imanuel Aboab's Nomologia o discursos legales - The Struggle over the Authority of the Law: Jerusalem 1997
 Roth, Cecil. “Immanuel Aboab’s Proselytization of the Marranos.” JQR 23(1932-33): pg. 121-62.

External links
Link to digitised text of Nomologia

1550s births
1628 deaths
Jewish Portuguese writers
16th-century Portuguese rabbis
16th-century Italian rabbis
People from Porto
17th-century Italian rabbis